Funk Mobb was an American, short lived rap group composed of Bay Area rappers, K-1, G-Note and Mac Shawn who were signed by Sick Wid It and Jive Records. They were only active from 1994 to 1998, first appearing on Little Bruce's debut album, XXXtra Mannish and then releasing their one and only album in 1996, It Ain't 4 Play. It peaked at number 46 on the Billboard Top R&B/Hip-Hop Albums and at number 28 on the Billboard Top Heatseekers. After the album the group would disband with Mac Shawn releasing two albums, 1997's Music fo' the Mobb and 2001's Worldwide Bosses and Playas and even joining Death Row Records for a short while. In 1999 G-Note joined No Limit Records and changed his name to Lil Italy. There he released his debut solo album, On Top of da World.

Discography

Studio albums
It Ain't 4 Play (1996)

Solo projects
Mac Shawn – Music fo' tha' Mobb (1997)
G-Note – On Top of da World (1999)
G-Note – Full Blown (2001)
Mac Shawn Presents – Worldwide Bosses and Playas (2001)

Guest appearances

References

External links

 Funk Mobb at Discogs

Hip hop groups from California
Jive Records artists
Musical groups disestablished in 1998
Musical groups established in 1994
Musical groups from the San Francisco Bay Area
American musical trios
Musicians from Vallejo, California
Gangsta rap groups
1994 establishments in California